Olav Råstad (born 2 February 1979) is a Norwegian football midfielder.

Born in Harstad, he started his career in Harstad IL, joined Norwegian Premier League team Tromsø in 1999 and Bodø/Glimt in 2002.

References
100% Fotball - Norwegian Premier League statistics

1979 births
Living people
Norwegian footballers
Tromsø IL players
FK Bodø/Glimt players
People from Harstad
Harstad IL players
Steinkjer FK players

Association football midfielders
Sportspeople from Troms og Finnmark